Kyle Alexander Jameson (born 11 September 1998) is an English professional footballer who plays for Tranmere Rovers as a central defender.

Career
Born in Urmston, Jameson spent his early career with Southport, signing for Chelsea in January 2017. He then moved to West Bromwich Albion in August 2017, and spent a loan spell at Barrow during the 2018–19 season, before signing for A.F.C. Fylde in May 2019. He left Fylde in August 2020 after his contract was mutually terminated.

On 1 September 2020, he signed for Oldham Athletic. Jameson was released following relegation at the end of the 2021–22 season.

He signed for Tranmere Rovers on 13 July 2022.

Career statistics

References

1998 births
Living people
English footballers
Southport F.C. players
Chelsea F.C. players
West Bromwich Albion F.C. players
Barrow A.F.C. players
AFC Fylde players
Oldham Athletic A.F.C. players
Tranmere Rovers F.C. players
National League (English football) players
English Football League players
Association football defenders